In the taxonomy of microorganisms, the Methanomicrobiales are an order of the Methanomicrobia.  Methanomicrobiales are strictly carbon dioxide reducing methanogens, using hydrogen or formate as the reducing agent.
As seen from the phylogenetic tree based on 'The All-Species Living Tree' Project the family Methanomicrobiaceae is highly polyphyletic within the Methanomicrobiales.

Phylogeny
The currently accepted taxonomy is based on the List of Prokaryotic names with Standing in Nomenclature (LPSN) and National Center for Biotechnology Information (NCBI).

See also
 List of Archaea genera

References

Further reading

Scientific journals

Scientific books

Scientific databases

External links

Archaea taxonomic orders
Euryarchaeota